Ratíškovice is a municipality and village in Hodonín District in the South Moravian Region of the Czech Republic. It has about 4,000 inhabitants.

Geography
It lies in a flat landscape of the Lower Morava Valley.

History

The first written mention of Ratíškovice is from 1141, in a deed of bishop Jindřich Zdík. It is one of the oldest villages in the area.

People in Ratíškovice were mainly farmers, they used to grow rye, barley, oat, potatoes, corn, millet and hemp. At the end of the 19th century, they started to work in mines in Dubňany and Milotice.

Economy
Ratíškovice is known for viticulture and wine-making. The municipality lies in the Slovácká wine sub-region.

Sport
Football club FK Baník Ratíškovice is based in Ratíškovice. It plays in the lower amateur tiers.

Sights
The most important monument is the Church of Saints Cyril and Methodius. It was built in 1855–1857.

Notable people
Josef Vacenovský (born 1937), footballer
Anna Hubáčková (born 1957), politician
Michal Kordula (born 1978), football player and manager

Twin towns – sister cities

Ratíškovice is twinned with:
 Vouziers, France

References

External links

Villages in Hodonín District
Moravian Slovakia